The Equality Trust is a UK registered charity that campaigns against economic and social inequality.

History 
It began as a campaigning organisation founded in 2009 by Bill Kerry, Richard G. Wilkinson and Kate Pickett after the publication of Wilkinson and Pickett's book The Spirit Level: Why More Equal Societies Almost Always Do Better. It became a registered charity in 2015. It is dedicated to reducing income inequality in the UK.  It has an office in the Holloway Road, North London. and has affiliated local groups across the UK and a network of international equality groups and contacts.

The Trust ran a campaign for greater equality in the lead up to the 2010 United Kingdom general election.

It argues that there is a strong association between low economic growth and inequality.

The Trust was cited by Caroline Lucas as demonstrating "a clear and demonstrable correlation between drug misuse and inequality" and that drug abuse is more common in more unequal countries such as the UK in her campaign for review of the Misuse of Drugs Act 1971.

The Trust's Executive Director is Dr. Wanda Wyporska.

Wilkinson and Pickett have published a second book, The Inner Level: How More Equal Societies Reduce Stress, Restore Sanity and Improve Everybody's Wellbeing in 2018.

References

External links
 Equality Trust

Organizations established in 2009
Organisations based in the London Borough of Islington
Political advocacy groups in England